Damon Nikco Riesgo (born January 11, 1967) is a former Major League Baseball (MLB) player. Riesgo played for the Montreal Expos in 1991. He batted and threw right-handed.

Riesgo played college baseball at San Diego State where he was named a freshman All-American and, as a sophomore, had a .413 batting average and set a school record with 10 triples.

He was drafted by the San Diego Padres in the 8th round of the 1988 amateur draft.

Riesgo made his Major League debut on April 20, 1991 at Shea Stadium against the New York Mets and recorded his first and only hit in MLB, a line drive single off of Frank Viola. He would appear in a total of four games, drawing four walks in ten plate appearances, between his debut on April 20 and final game on April 26, 1991.

Riesgo served as a replacement player during the 1994–95 Major League Baseball strike for the Boston Red Sox but was released before the start of the 1995 season. He co-authored a book about his experiences during the strike entitled Strike Three! - A Player's Journey Through the Infamous Baseball Strike Of 1994.

References

External links

1967 births
Living people
Alexandria Aces players
Alexandria Dukes players
American expatriate baseball players in Canada
Baseball players from Long Beach, California
Beloit Brewers players
Charleston Rainbows players
El Paso Diablos players
Laredo Apaches players
Lubbock Crickets players
Major League Baseball outfielders
Major League Baseball replacement players
Memphis Chicks players
Montreal Expos players
New Orleans Zephyrs players
Reading Phillies players
Spokane Indians players
St. Lucie Mets players
West Palm Beach Expos players
Long Beach Polytechnic High School alumni